Johnny Squires was a Republic of Ireland international footballer.

A forward, Squires was capped once for the Republic of Ireland at senior level. He made his debut scoring in a 5–2 defeat to the Netherlands on 8 April 1934, thus becoming the first Irish player to score in an away fixture in the World Cup.

References

External links
 Profile from soccerscene.ie

Republic of Ireland association footballers
Association football forwards
Republic of Ireland international footballers
Dundalk F.C. players
Shamrock Rovers F.C. players
Year of birth missing